Tatar-e Sofla, also known as Tatar-e Pain, may refer to:
 Tatar-e Sofla, East Azerbaijan
 Tatar-e Sofla, Golestan